Tohuvabohu is industrial rock group KMFDM's fifteenth studio album, released on August 21, 2007, on the band's record label KMFDM Records and Metropolis Records. It was recorded in Seattle, Washington.

The word "tohuvabohu" is derived from the biblical Hebrew phrase "tohu va bohu", meaning "without form and void" or "chaos and utter confusion", which was used to describe the state of the earth before creation. The band describes its usage of the term as meaning "wild and chaotic".
"Superpower" uses samples taken from phone calls made by fans to a phone line set up by the band. Additional samples from these phone calls were compiled on the track "What We Do For You" on Brimborium, a companion remix album.

Cover art conflict
Shortly after the cover artwork for Tohuvabohu was revealed on the KMFDM website, longtime cover artist Brute! made a posting to his personal blog indicating his displeasure at the fact that the band had altered his original artwork submission. In the final version used on the album, in order to follow preexisting themes, the original red color palette had been switched to orange, and several stylized buildings and cranes in the background had been replaced with a starburst pattern.

Track listing

Personnel
 Lucia Cifarelli – vocals
 Jules Hodgson – guitar, bass, programming
 Sascha Konietzko – vocals, analogue synthesizers, bass, programming
 Andy Selway – drums, programming
 Steve White – guitar, programming
 Army Denio – alto saxophone (1)
 Jin Kninja – Paris Selmer 'radial' trumpet (1)

References

2007 albums
KMFDM albums
Metropolis Records albums
Albums produced by Sascha Konietzko